Clifford Evans may refer to:

 Clifford Evans (actor) (1912–1985), Welsh actor
 Cliff Evans (rugby league) (1913–1982), Welsh rugby league footballer
 Clifford Evans (ecologist) (1913–2006), British ecologist
 Clifford Percy Evans (1889–1973), American architect
 Clifford R. Evans (1937–2018), Canadian trade unionist